Pengbu may refer to:

 Pengbu Town, Hangzhou, China
 Pengbu Station, Hangzhou Metro, China